Preston James Pearson (born January 17, 1945) is a former American football running back in the National Football League (NFL) for the Baltimore Colts, Pittsburgh Steelers and Dallas Cowboys. He played college basketball at the University of Illinois.

Early years
Pearson attended Freeport High School in Freeport, Illinois, where he received All-State honors as the center of the basketball team. He also competed in football and track.

After writing a letter to head coach Harry Combes, he walked on at the University of Illinois. In college, he was moved to guard and became a two-year starter. He was known primarily for his tough defense and was one of the few players who ever blocked a "skyhook" shot by Lew Alcindor (later known as Kareem Abdul-Jabbar).

Although he possessed the athletic and leaping ability, he never developed his offensive game, finishing his career with a 6.7 point average in 47 games. As a senior, he was named a starter at guard, averaging 8.7 points and 6.0 rebounds per game.

In 2017, he was inducted into the Illinois Basketball Coaches Association's Hall of Fame.

Professional career

Baltimore Colts
Pearson was selected by the Baltimore Colts in the twelfth round (298th overall) of the 1967 NFL Draft, despite never playing a down of college football, after the team was impressed with his speed and athleticism. He was first tried at defensive back and was promoted from the taxi squad to the regular roster on November 1, playing mostly on special teams.

In 1968, he was moved to running back and became a captain of the special teams units after leading the league in kickoff returns with a 35.1-yard average. He registered the longest kickoff return of the year in the NFL (102 yards). He averaged more than 4 yards per carry, scored on two pass receptions, and had a kickoff return for a 96-yard touchdown.

On May 31, 1970, he was traded, along with defensive back Ocie Austin, to the Pittsburgh Steelers in exchange for linebacker Ray May and a twelfth round draft choice (#294-Bobby Wuensch).

Pittsburgh Steelers
In 1970, he reunited with head coach Chuck Noll who was the defensive coordinator with the Baltimore Colts. He became the starter at running back in his first year with the team. In 1971, he was the fifteenth ranked running back in the AFC with 605 yards (second on the team).

In 1972, he was the eighth leading rusher in the AFC through the first 4 games, until he tore his left hamstring against the Houston Oilers. He was replaced with rookie Franco Harris, who would not relinquish the position again on his way to the Pro Football Hall of Fame. In 1973, he was switched to wide receiver during training camp, but was moved back to running back before the start of the season.

His relationship with Noll eventually became strained, because of being an outspoken person and his role as one of the Steelers player representatives during the 1974 strike. In 1974, he was the team's third leading rusher even though he missed five games with a hamstring injury.

On September 16, 1975, the team waived him after deciding to keep rookie running back Mike Collier instead. At the time, only six players in franchise history had run for more yards.

Dallas Cowboys
On September 19, 1975, after losing Calvin Hill  and Walt Garrison, the Dallas Cowboys were looking for an experienced running back, so they signed Pearson as a free agent and in turn waived rookie quarterback Jim Zorn to make room for him on the roster. It has been noted that the acquisition of Pearson and the success of the Dirty Dozen draft were the key reasons that helped the team reach the Super Bowl that year.

His best season came in 1975, when he became a starter and rushed for 509 yards, caught 27 passes for 351 yards, and gained another 391 yards on kickoff returns. He then went on to assist the Cowboys to a Super Bowl X appearance by catching 12 passes for over 200 yards and three touchdowns in their two playoff games, including a reception for 123 yards and three receiving touchdowns (tied a league record) against the heavily favored Los Angeles Rams in the NFC title game. His team ended up losing the Super Bowl to the Pittsburgh Steelers, with Pearson rushing for 14 yards and catching 5 passes for 53 yards.

During his time with the Cowboys he was widely recognized as the player who defined the position of "third-down back", forcing defenses to use nickel schemes to assign a cornerback to cover him, or to double-team him. He was an all-around player, contributing in running, receiving, blocking and special teams. Head coach Tom Landry once said: "He's one of the best halfback blockers I've seen".

In 1976, he was limited after having knee surgery for a training camp injury. Although he was named the starting running back at the beginning of the year, he was able to start just two games in the regular season. He appeared in 10 games, posting 68 carries for 233 yards, one rushing touchdown, 23 receptions for 316 yards and 2 receiving touchdowns.

In 1977, he began the season as the starter at running back, before giving way to Tony Dorsett after the ninth game.  He set the franchise record for receptions by a running back and finished second on the team with 46, while also tallying 535 receiving yards (second on the team).

In 1978, he led the team and broke his own club season record for receptions by a running back with 47, while collecting 526 receiving yards (second on the team).

In 1979, he registered 26 receptions (23 for first downs) for 333 receiving yards, one receiving touchdown, 7 carries for 14 yards, and one rushing touchdown. In the 35-34 win against the Washington Redskins, he collected 5 catches for 108 yards. He also had a diving 26-yard touchdown reception at the end of the first half, and 2 catches for 47 yards in the final drive, including a 25-yarder that set up the winning touchdown at the Redskins' eight yard line.

In his last season he was used mostly as a receiver in the backfield and retired on July 15, 1981.

Legacy
Throughout his NFL career, Pearson was used frequently as a rusher, receiver, and kickoff returner on special teams. He played for some of the most famous teams of his era, and played in five Super Bowls (Super Bowl III, IX, X, XII, and XIII) – tied for third most all-time.

In his 14 NFL seasons, he rushed for 3,609 yards, caught 254 passes for 3,095 yards, returned seven punts for 40 yards, and gained 2,801 yards on kickoff returns.  Overall, Pearson gained 9,545 total yards and scored 33 touchdowns (17 rushing, 13 receiving, two kickoff returns and one fumble recovery). He was the first player to appear in the Super Bowl with 3 different teams.

Pearson also holds the distinction of being one of the few, if not the only, players to have been led by Don Shula, Chuck Noll, and Tom Landry — three of the greatest coaches in NFL history with eight Super Bowl titles among them. Not only were his coaches Hall of Famers, but also his quarterbacks (Johnny Unitas, Terry Bradshaw, and Roger Staubach) and some of his fellow running backs (Lenny Moore, Franco Harris, and Tony Dorsett) are enshrined in Canton.

Personal life
In 1981, Pearson teamed with self-promoter Janie Tilford to form Pro-Style Associates.  Pro-Style began by matching corporations with athletic talent to create a unique marketing endeavor for special events.  Preston is the president of Pro-Style Associates.

During the formation of the Asia Pacific Football League, Pearson was contracted by the league to consult and assist the league in its organizational efforts.  What became of his role is unknown as the APFL was never formed.

Pearson wrote a 1985 memoir, Hearing the Noise, My Life in the NFL, .

References

External links

Official web site
Pearson's stats at databasefootball.com

1945 births
Living people
People from Freeport, Illinois
Players of American football from Illinois
American football running backs
Baltimore Colts players
Pittsburgh Steelers players
Dallas Cowboys players
Basketball players from Illinois
American men's basketball players
Centers (basketball)
Freeport High School (Illinois) alumni
Illinois Fighting Illini men's basketball players